R. C. Clark High School is a co-educational secondary school in Plano, Texas (USA) serving grades nine and ten. Founded in 1979, the school is part of the Plano Independent School District. Hendrick Middle School, Carpenter Middle School, and Schimelpfenig Middle School feed into Clark. Students leaving Clark go on to attend Plano Senior High School. The school colors are red, white, and black, and the school mascot is the Cougar.

The high school recently added a new wing to the building for the 2012-2013 school year due to overcrowding in the old building. The new building houses science, art, and foreign language classes.

Clark High School maintains an enrollment of over 1,500. The school's current principal is Pamela Clark .

History
Clark High School is named in honor of Richard Calhoun Clark, a pioneer, and farmer who served in the Civil War under General R.W. Carpenter after the death of his father.

Previous Feeder Schools
Previously, only Carpenter and Hendrick Middle Schools fed into Clark High School and were zoned to Plano East Senior High until 2011-2012. In the 2011-2012 school year, Schimelpfenig students got to chose whether to go to Clark or Jasper High School. In the 2012-2013 school year, after school population debate, Schimelpfenig was zoned only to Clark High School.

Courses
Clark High School currently offers 3 AP courses: AP Human Geography, AP World History, and AP European History. Additionally, starting in the 2017-2018 school year, Clark will also offer AP Fundamentals of Computer Science. Students may also take AP Statistics at Plano Senior High School if they have completed all prior math courses. If there are enough students registered for the course, Clark High School will offer AP Calculus AB or BC; otherwise, students may take the course at Plano Senior High School. Clark also offers a variety of honors, regulars, and extracurricular courses along with many sports. Student athletes may choose to play for the Plano Senior High School teams.

School awards
Exemplary and/or Recognized Ratings by the Texas Education Agency.
2006 Just for the Kids Honor Role recipient
Texas Successful Schools Award for Outstanding Improvement in Reading & Math.
Meadows Charitable School Projects Award
1992–93 National Blue Ribbon School

References

External links
 

High schools in Plano, Texas
Plano Independent School District high schools